Millard may refer to:


Places in the United States
 Millard, Missouri, a village
 Millard, Omaha, Nebraska, a former suburb and present-day neighborhood of Omaha
 Millard Creek, Pennsylvania
 Millard County, Utah
 Millard, Virginia, an unincorporated community
 Millard, Wisconsin, an unincorporated community

Schools
 Millard's Preparatory School, a now-defunct military preparatory school in Washington, D.C.

People and fictional characters
 Millard (surname)
 Millard (given name), a list of people and fictional characters
 a nickname of Glenn McGrath (born 1970), Australian former cricketer

See also
 Millard Public Schools, a district in Omaha, Nebraska, US
 Milliard, one thousand million